is a Japanese actor.

References

21st-century Japanese male actors
Japanese male child actors
1996 births
Living people
People from Miyazaki Prefecture